The San Fernando Department was a Chilean department. In 1891, its capital was San Fernando, and comprised the communes of Roma, Chimbarongo, Nancagua, Palmilla, Placilla, Matanzas, La Estrella, and Pichilemu.

References

Former departments of Chile